United States Coast Guard Station Washington is a United States Coast Guard station located on Joint Base Anacostia-Bolling in Washington, D.C. The station was commissioned on September 23, 2003.

References

External links

2003 establishments in Washington, D.C.
United States Coast Guard stations
Military facilities in Washington, D.C.